Pekka Alanen (born 14 July 1945) is a Finnish wrestler. He competed at the 1964 Summer Olympics and the 1968 Summer Olympics.

References

External links
 

1945 births
Living people
Finnish male sport wrestlers
Olympic wrestlers of Finland
Wrestlers at the 1964 Summer Olympics
Wrestlers at the 1968 Summer Olympics
People from Lappajärvi
Sportspeople from South Ostrobothnia